Harold Frederick Shipman (14 January 1946 – 13 January 2004), known to acquaintances as Fred Shipman, was an English general practitioner and serial killer. He is considered to be one of the most prolific serial killers in modern history, with an estimated 250 victims. On 31 January 2000, Shipman was found guilty of murdering 15 patients under his care. He was sentenced to life imprisonment with a whole life order. Shipman died by suicide by hanging himself in his cell at HM Prison Wakefield, West Yorkshire, on 13 January 2004, aged 57.

The Shipman Inquiry, a two-year-long investigation of all deaths certified by Shipman, chaired by Dame Janet Smith, examined Shipman's crimes. It revealed Shipman targeted vulnerable elderly people who trusted him as he was their doctor. He killed his victims either by a fatal dose of drugs or prescribing them an abnormal amount.

Shipman, who was nicknamed "Dr Death" and "The Angel of Death", is the only British doctor to date to have been convicted of murdering his patients, although other doctors have been acquitted of similar crimes or convicted of lesser charges.

Early life and career
Shipman was born on 14 January 1946 on the Bestwood Estate, a council estate, in Nottingham, the second of the three children of Harold Frederick Shipman (12 May 1914 – 5 January 1985), a lorry driver, and Vera Brittan (23 December 1919 – 21 June 1963). His working-class parents were devout Methodists. When growing up, Shipman was an accomplished rugby player in youth leagues.

Shipman passed his eleven-plus in 1957, moving to High Pavement Grammar School, Nottingham, which he left in 1964. He excelled as a distance runner, and in his final year at school served as vice-captain of the athletics team. Shipman was particularly close to his mother, who died of lung cancer when he was aged seventeen. Her death came in a manner similar to what later became Shipman's own modus operandi: in the later stages of her disease, she had morphine administered at home by a doctor. Shipman witnessed his mother's pain subside, despite her terminal condition, until her death on 21 June 1963. On 5 November 1966, he married Primrose May Oxtoby; the couple had four children.

Shipman studied medicine at Leeds School of Medicine, University of Leeds, graduating in 1970. He began working at Pontefract General Infirmary in Pontefract, West Riding of Yorkshire, and in 1974 took his first position as a general practitioner (GP) at the Abraham Ormerod Medical Centre in Todmorden. The following year, Shipman was caught forging prescriptions of pethidine for his own use. He was fined £600 and briefly attended a drug rehabilitation clinic in York. He became a GP at the Donneybrook Medical Centre in Hyde, Greater Manchester, in 1977.

Shipman continued working as a GP in Hyde throughout the 1980s and established his own surgery at 21 Market Street in 1993, becoming a respected member of the community. In 1983, he was interviewed in an edition of the Granada Television current affairs documentary World in Action on how the mentally ill should be treated in the community. A year after his conviction on charges of murder, the interview was re-broadcast on Tonight with Trevor McDonald.

Detection
In March 1998, Linda Reynolds of the Brooke Surgery in Hyde expressed concerns to John Pollard, the coroner for the South Manchester District, about the high death rate among Shipman's patients. In particular, she was concerned about the large number of cremation forms for elderly women that he had needed countersigned. Police were unable to find sufficient evidence to bring charges and closed the investigation on 17 April. The Shipman Inquiry later blamed Greater Manchester Police for assigning inexperienced officers to the case. After the investigation was closed, Shipman killed three more people. A few months later, in August, taxi driver John Shaw told the police that he suspected Shipman of murdering 21 patients. Shaw became suspicious as many of the elderly customers he took to the hospital, who seemed to be in good health, died in Shipman's care.

Shipman's last victim was Kathleen Grundy, a former mayor of Hyde who was found dead at her home on 24 June 1998. He was the last person to see her alive; he later signed her death certificate, recording the cause of death as old age. Grundy's daughter, solicitor Angela Woodruff, became concerned when fellow solicitor Brian Burgess informed her that a will had been made, apparently by her mother, with doubts about its authenticity. The will excluded Woodruff and her children, but left £386,000 to Shipman. At Burgess' urging, Woodruff went to the police, who began an investigation. Grundy's body was exhumed and found to contain traces of diamorphine (heroin), often used for pain control in terminal cancer patients. Shipman claimed that Grundy had been an addict and showed them comments he had written to that effect in his computerised medical journal; however, police examination of his computer showed that the entries were written after her death.

Shipman was arrested on 7 September 1998, and was found to own a Brother typewriter of the type used to make the forged will. Prescription for Murder, a 2000 book by journalists Brian Whittle and Jean Ritchie, suggested that Shipman forged the will either because he wanted to be caught, because his life was out of control, or because he planned to retire at 55 and leave the UK.

The police investigated other deaths Shipman had certified and investigated fifteen specimen cases. They discovered a pattern of his administering lethal doses of diamorphine, signing patients' death certificates, and then falsifying medical records to indicate that they had been in poor health.

In 2003, David Spiegelhalter et al. suggested that "statistical monitoring could have led to an alarm being raised at the end of 1996, when there were 67 excess deaths in females aged over 65 years, compared with 119 by 1998."

Trial and imprisonment
Shipman's trial began at Preston Crown Court on 5 October 1999. He was charged with the murders of 15 women by lethal injections of diamorphine, all between 1995 and 1998:
   
Shipman's legal representatives tried unsuccessfully to have the Grundy case tried separately from the others, as a motive was shown by the alleged forgery of Grundy's will.
 
On 31 January 2000, after six days of deliberation, the jury found Shipman guilty of 15 counts of murder and one count of forgery. Mr Justice Forbes subsequently sentenced Shipman to life imprisonment on all 15 counts of murder, with a recommendation that he be subject to a  whole life tariff, to be served concurrently with a sentence of four years for forging Grundy's will.  On 11 February, 11 days after his conviction, Shipman was struck off the medical register by the General Medical Council (GMC). Two years later, Home Secretary David Blunkett confirmed the judge's whole life tariff, just months before British government ministers lost their power to set minimum terms for prisoners. While authorities could have brought many additional charges, they concluded that a fair hearing would be impossible in view of the enormous publicity surrounding the original trial. Furthermore, the 15 life sentences already imposed rendered further litigation unnecessary. Shipman became friends with fellow serial killer Peter Moore while in prison.

Shipman denied his guilt, disputing the scientific evidence against him. He never made any public statements about his actions. Shipman's wife, Primrose, maintained that he was not guilty, even after his conviction.

Shipman is the only doctor in the history of British medicine found guilty of murdering his patients. John Bodkin Adams was charged in 1957 with murdering a single patient, amid rumours he had killed dozens more over a 10-year period and "possibly provided the role model for Shipman"; however, he was acquitted and no further charges were pursued. Historian Pamela Cullen has argued that because of Adams' acquittal, there was no impetus to examine asserted flaws in the British legal system until the Shipman case.

Death

Shipman hanged himself in his cell at HM Prison Wakefield at 6:20 a.m. on 13 January 2004, aged 57. He was pronounced dead at 8:10 a.m. A statement from Her Majesty's Prison Service indicated that he had hanged himself from the window bars of his cell using his bed sheets. After Shipman's death, his body was taken to the mortuary at the Medico Legal Centre in Sheffield by undertaker’s van for a post-mortem examination. West Yorkshire Coroner David Hinchliff eventually released the body to his family after an inquest was opened and adjourned shortly after.

Some of the victims' families said they felt "cheated", as Shipman's suicide meant they would never have the satisfaction of a confession, nor answers as to why he committed his crimes. Home Secretary David Blunkett admitted that celebration was tempting: "You wake up and you receive a call telling you Shipman has topped himself and you think, is it too early to open a bottle? And then you discover that everybody's very upset that he's done it."

Shipman's death divided national newspapers, with the Daily Mirror branding him a "cold coward" and condemning the Prison Service for allowing his suicide to happen. However, The Sun ran a celebratory front-page headline; "Ship Ship hooray!" The Independent called for the inquiry into Shipman's suicide to look more widely at the state of UK prisons as well as the welfare of inmates. In The Guardian, an article by General Sir David Ramsbotham, who had formerly served as Her Majesty's Chief Inspector of Prisons, suggested that whole life sentencing be replaced by indefinite sentencing, for this would at least give prisoners the hope of eventual release and reduce the risk of their ending their own lives by suicide, as well as making their management easier for prison officials.

Shipman's motive for suicide was never established, though he reportedly told his probation officer that he was considering suicide to assure his wife's financial security after he was stripped of his National Health Service pension.
Primrose Shipman received a full NHS pension; she would not have been entitled to it if Shipman had lived past the age of sixty. Additionally, there was evidence that Primrose, who had consistently protested Shipman's innocence despite the overwhelming evidence, had begun to suspect his guilt. Shipman refused to take part in courses which would have encouraged acknowledgement of his crimes, leading to a temporary removal of privileges, including the opportunity to telephone his wife. During this period, according to Shipman's cellmate, he received a letter from Primrose exhorting him to, "Tell me everything, no matter what." A 2005 inquiry found that Shipman's suicide "could not have been predicted or prevented," but that procedures should nonetheless be re-examined.

After Shipman's body was released to his family, it remained in Sheffield for more than a year despite multiple false reports about his funeral. His widow was advised by police against burying her husband in case the grave was attacked. Shipman was eventually cremated on 19 March 2005 at Hutcliffe Wood Crematorium. The cremation took place outside normal working hours to maintain secrecy and was attended only by Primrose and the couple's four children.

Aftermath
In January 2001, Chris Gregg, a senior West Yorkshire Police detective, was selected to lead an investigation into 22 of the West Yorkshire deaths. Following this, The Shipman Inquiry, submitted in July 2002, concluded that he had killed at least 218 of his patients between 1975 and 1998, during which time he practised in Todmorden (1974–1975) and Hyde (1977–1998). Dame Janet Smith, the judge who submitted the report, admitted that many more deaths of a suspicious nature could not be definitively ascribed to Shipman. Most of his victims were elderly women in good health.

In her sixth and final report, issued on 24 January 2005, Smith reported that she believed that Shipman had killed three patients, and she had serious suspicions about four further deaths, including that of a four-year-old girl, during the early stage of his medical career at Pontefract General Infirmary. In total, 459 people died while under his care between 1971 and 1998, but it is uncertain how many of those were murder victims, as he was often the only doctor to certify a death. Smith's estimate of Shipman's total victim count over that 27-year period was 250.

The GMC charged six doctors, who signed cremation forms for Shipman's victims, with misconduct, claiming they should have noticed the pattern between Shipman's home visits and his patients' deaths. All these doctors were found not guilty. In October 2005, a similar hearing was held against two doctors who worked at Tameside General Hospital in 1994, who failed to detect that Shipman had deliberately administered a "grossly excessive" dose of morphine. The Shipman Inquiry recommended changes to the structure of the GMC.

In 2005, it came to light that Shipman may have stolen jewellery from his victims. In 1998, police had seized over £10,000 worth of jewellery they found in his garage. In March 2005, when Primrose asked for its return, police wrote to the families of Shipman's victims asking them to identify the jewellery. Unidentified items were handed to the Assets Recovery Agency in May. The investigation ended in August. Authorities returned 66 pieces to Primrose and auctioned 33 pieces that she confirmed were not hers. Proceeds of the auction went to Tameside Victim Support. The only piece returned to a murdered patient's family was a platinum diamond ring, for which the family provided a photograph as proof of ownership.

A memorial garden to Shipman's victims, called the Garden of Tranquillity, opened in Hyde Park, Hyde, on 30 July 2005. As of early 2009, families of over 200 of the victims of Shipman were still seeking compensation for the loss of their relatives. In September 2009, letters Shipman wrote in prison to friends were to be sold at auction, but following complaints from victims' relatives and the media, the sale was withdrawn.

Shipman effect
The Shipman case, and a series of recommendations in the Shipman Inquiry report, led to changes to standard medical procedures in the UK (now referred to as the "Shipman effect"). Many doctors reported changes in their dispensing practices, and a reluctance to risk over-prescribing pain medication may have led to under-prescribing. Death certification practices were altered as well. Perhaps the largest change was the movement from single-doctor general practices to multiple-doctor general practices. This was not a direct recommendation, but rather because the report stated that there was not enough safeguarding and monitoring of doctors' decisions.

The forms needed for a cremation in England and Wales have had their questions altered as a direct result of the Shipman case. For example, the person(s) organising the funeral must answer, "Do you know or suspect that the death of the person who has died was violent or unnatural? Do you consider that there should be any further examination of the remains of the person who has died?"

In media
Harold and Fred (They Make Ladies Dead) was a cartoon strip in a 2001 issue of Viz comic, also featuring serial killer Fred West. Some relatives of Shipman's victims voiced anger at the cartoon.

Harold Shipman: Doctor Death, an ITV television dramatisation of the case, was broadcast in 2002; it starred James Bolam in the title role.

A documentary also titled Harold Shipman: Doctor Death, with new witness testimony about the serial killer, was shown by ITV as part of its Crime & Punishment strand on 26 April 2018. The programme was criticised as offering "little new insight".

A play titled Beyond Belief – Scenes from the Shipman Inquiry, written by Dennis Woolf and directed by Chris Honer was performed at the Library Theatre, Manchester, from 20 October to 22 November 2004. The script of the play comprised edited verbatim extracts from the Shipman Inquiry, spoken by actors playing the witnesses and lawyers at the inquiry. This provided a "stark narrative" that focused on personal tragedies.

A BBC drama-documentary, entitled Harold Shipman and starring Ian Brooker in the title role, was broadcast in April 2014.

The satirical artist Cold War Steve regularly features Shipman in his work.

The Shipman Files: A Very British Crime Story, a three-part documentary by Chris Wilson, was broadcast on BBC Two on three consecutive nights between 28 and 30 September 2020, and focussed on Shipman's victims and how he went undetected for so long.

Podcast episode Catching a Killer Doctor from the Cautionary Tales with Tim Harford podcast series features the story of Harold Shipman and how it could have been detected much earlier with good statistical models.

The 2005 song "What About Us?" by British band the Fall makes explicit reference to the Shipman killings ("There was a man going round all the time/He was dishing out drugs/He was a doctor/Dishing out morphine to old ladies"), and the name Shipman is sung as backing vocals during the choruses.

Shipman was a member of the Conservative Party and was mentioned in the 2022 Wakefield by-election when Conservative candidate Nadeem Ahmed highlighted his local connections, following Shipman's suicide in Wakefield prison, claiming that voters should "trust Tories like they do GPs after Harold Shipman".

In 2023, DeadHappy, a Leicester-based life insurance firm, was criticised for using an image of Shipman in one of its advertisements. The Advertising Standards Authority received more than 70 complaints about the advert.

See also

 List of serial killers in the United Kingdom
 List of serial killers by number of victims
 Euthanasia
 Jessie McTavish
 John Bodkin Adams
 Colin Norris
 2011 Stepping Hill Hospital poisoning incident
 Niels Högel
 Jayant Patel
 Beverley Allitt
 Michael Swango
 Leonard Arthur
 Howard Martin
 David Moor
 Thomas Lodwig
 Nigel Cox
 Christopher Duntsch
 Charles Cullen
 Jack Kevorkian
 Benjamin Geen

References

External links
 Shipman Inquiry (archived)
 BBC – The Shipman Murders
 List of suspected murders
 Harold Shipman's Clinical Practice 1974–1998 
 Caso abierto, Dr Death: The Shipman Case

1946 births
2004 deaths
2004 suicides
20th-century English criminals
20th-century English medical doctors
Alumni of the University of Leeds
British general practitioners
Criminals from Nottinghamshire
English people convicted of murder
English prisoners sentenced to life imprisonment
English serial killers
History of Tameside
Male serial killers
Medical controversies in the United Kingdom
Medical doctors struck off by the General Medical Council
Medical practitioners convicted of murdering their patients
Medical serial killers
People convicted of murder by England and Wales
People educated at Nottingham High Pavement Grammar School
People from Nottingham
People with antisocial personality disorder
People who committed suicide in prison custody
Poisoners
Prisoners sentenced to life imprisonment by England and Wales
Prisoners who died in England and Wales detention
Serial killers who committed suicide in prison custody
Suicides by hanging in England